WGTE-FM (91.3 MHz) is a public radio station in Toledo, Ohio, and is the radio partner of Channel 30 WGTE-TV, Toledo's PBS network affiliate.  It features news, talk, classical music, jazz and folk music.  It also airs programs from National Public Radio (NPR) and Public Radio International (PRI).

Public Radio FM 91 is simulcast on three other radio stations:  WGBE (90.9 FM) in Bryan, Ohio, WGDE (91.9 FM) in Defiance, Ohio and WGLE (90.7 FM) in Lima, Ohio.  Several times each year, WGTE-FM does on-air fundraisers to ask for listener support for the radio stations.

History
On May 2, 1976, WGTE-FM signed on the air.  At first, its programming was mostly classical music with six hours of jazz per week and hourly news updates.  It also featured NPR's first weekday news program, "All Things Considered."  When NPR began "Morning Edition" in 1979, that program was also heard on the weekday schedule.  Gradually more news and talk programs from NPR and PRI were added, although unlike most other NPR affiliates, WGTE-FM continues to air a sizable number of classical music programs and some jazz and folk music on weekends.

In 1981, WGLE-FM in Lima became the first simulcast station of WGTE-FM.  WGBE-FM in Bryan was added in 1996 and WGDE-FM in Defiance signed on in 1999.

Repeaters

References

External links

Lima, Ohio
GTE-FM
Classical music radio stations in the United States
NPR member stations
1976 establishments in Ohio
Radio stations established in 1976